The OSGi framework is a standardized module system and service platform for the Java programming language. The OSGi standards are defined in the OSGi Specification Project at Eclipse and published in OSGi specification documents such as the Core and Compendium specifications. These specifications contain chapters each of which describe a specific OSGi standard. This article contains a list of available implementations of OSGi standards, both commercial and open source implementations are included. 

Feel free to add mentions to additional implementations.

Implementations realize specification chapter(s) from the OSGi specification documents.

Core Specification

 Latest Specification Release: R8
 Specification chapters: 2-10, 50-60, 101, 701
Specifications implemented by OSGi core frameworks. A compliant OSGi Framework must at least implement chapters 3-10 and 53-58.

Compendium Specification

 Latest Specification Release: R8
 Specification chapters: 100-117, 119-123, 125-128, 130, 132-138, 140, 147, 148, 150-155, 157-159, 702, 705-707

Enterprise Specification

 Latest Specification Release: R7
 Specification chapters: 100-102, 104-105, 107, 110, 112-113, 122-130, 132-135, 137, 138, 140, 147, 148, 150, 151, 152, 702, 705, 706, 707.
The Enterprise Specification contains an enterprise-focused subset of the OSGi specifications. Certain Specification chapters are not yet in the Compendium Specification document because it was released before the Enterprise Specification.

Residential Specification

 Latest Specification Release: R6
 Specification chapters: Res2, Res3, 101-105, 107, 110-113, 117, 131, 135, 139, 141-146, 702, 705

The first release of the OSGi Residential Specification resolved the requirements of inter-operation with existing management systems and protocols, the need to remotely manage user applications life cycle as well as the need for large-scale deployments and adequate security. With this second release of the OSGi Residential Specification we introduce new specifications for abstracting devices, sensors, actuators, etc. from their corresponding communication protocols and facilitate the development of new innovative application and services. This release also contains specifications that address device connectivity via the EnOcean wireless protocol, USB and serial port. With the Resource Monitoring Specification, resources consumed by bundles can be monitored in order to fairly share resources and preserve the overall quality of service. The Network Interface Information Service Specification enables dynamic discovery of changes in the network interface.

Mobile Specification

 Latest Specification Release: 4.0.1
 Specification chapters: 101, 104-105, 109, 112-120, 701-702

Implementations

The following sections list implementations of OSGi specifications organized by chapter. The Version column indicates the OSGi specification version supported, not the project version. The Certification column indicates whether an implementation participates in the OSGi Certification Program. The exact version of certified implementations can be obtained from the relevant implementation projects. Note that the order in which projects appear in the tables below is alphabetically.

2: Security
Latest Specification Version: 1.8

3 - 60: Core Framework
Chapters 3-60 in the Core Release 8 specification.

The Core Release 8 specification comprises the following APIs, which every framework implementation must implement:
 Chapter 3: Module Layer, version 1.10
 Chapter 4: Life Cycle Layer, version 1.10
 Chapter 5: Service Layer, version 1.10
 Chapter 6: Resource API Specification, version 1.0
 Chapter 7: Bundle Wiring API Specification, version 1.2
 Chapter 8: Framework Namespaces Specification, version 1.2
 Chapter 9: Start Level API Specification, version 1.0
 Chapter 10: Framework API Specification, which contains the following packages
 org.osgi.framework version 1.10
 org.osgi.framework.launch version 1.2
 org.osgi.resource version 1.0
 org.osgi.framework.wiring version 1.2
 org.osgi.framework.startlevel version 1.0
 org.osgi.framework.namespace version 1.2
 org.osgi.annotation.versioning version 1.1
 org.osgi.annotation.bundle version 1.1
 Chapter 53: Resolver Hook Service Specification, version 1.0
 Chapter 54: Bundle Hook Service Specification, version 1.1
 Chapter 55: Service Hook Service Specification, version 1.1
 Chapter 56: Weaving Hook Service Specification, version 1.1
 Chapter 57: Data Transfer Objects Specification, version 1.1
 Chapter 58: Resolver Service Specification version 1.1 (was chapter 136 in Enterprise/Compendium R6 specs)
 Chapter 59: Condition Service Specification, version 1.0
 Chapter 60: Connect Specification, version 1.0

7: Package Admin Service (OSGi Core Release 4.2 spec)
Latest Specification Version: 1.2

The Package Admin Service has been replaced by the Bundle Wiring API.

8: Start Level Service (OSGi Core Release 4.2 spec)
Latest Specification Version: 1.1

The Start Level Service has been replaced by the Start Level API.

50: Conditional Permission Admin Service
Chapter 9 in the Core 4.2 specification.

Latest Specification Version: 1.1

51: Permission Admin Service
Chapter 10 in the Core 4.2 specification.

Latest Specification Version: 1.2

52: URL Handler Service
Chapter 11 in the Core 4.2 specification.

Latest Specification Version: 1.0

53-60
Chapters 53 to 60 are part of the mandatory set of specifications implemented by every OSGi Core Framework.

100: Remote Services
Chapter 13 in the Compendium 4.2 and Enterprise 4.2 specifications.
Chapter 6 in the Core 4.3 specification.

Latest Specification Version: 1.1

101: Log Service 
Latest Specification Version: 1.4

102: HTTP Service 
Latest Specification Version: 1.2

103: Device Access Service 
Latest Specification Version: 1.1

104: Configuration Admin Service 
Latest Specification Version: 1.6

105: Metatype Service 
Latest Specification Version: 1.4

106: Preference Service 
Latest Specification Version: 1.1

107: User Admin Service 
Latest Specification Version: 1.1

108: Wire Admin Service 
Latest Specification Version: 1.0

109: IO Connector Service 
Latest Specification Version: 1.3

110: Initial Provisioning Service 
Latest Specification Version: 1.2

111: Device Service Specification for UPnP™ 
Latest Specification Version: 1.2

112: Declarative Services 
Latest Specification Version: 1.4

113: Event Admin Service 
Latest Specification Version: 1.4

114: Deployment Admin Service 
Latest Specification Version: 1.1

115: Auto Configuration Service 
Latest Specification Version: 1.0

116: Application Admin Service 
Latest Specification Version: 1.1

117: DMT Admin Service 
Latest Specification Version: 2.0

119: Monitor Admin Service 
Latest Specification Version: 1.0

120: Foreign Applications Access 
Latest Specification Version: 1.0

121: Blueprint Container 
Latest Specification Version: 1.0

122: Remote Service Admin 
Latest Specification Version: 1.1

123: JTA Service 
Latest Specification Version: 1.0

124: JMX Management Model 
Latest Specification Version: 1.1

125: Data Service Specification for JDBC™ Technology 
Latest Specification Version: 1.0

126: JNDI Service 
Latest Specification Version: 1.0

127: JPA Service 
Latest Specification Version: 1.1

128: Web Applications 
Latest Specification Version: 1.0

129: SCA Configuration Type 
Latest Specification Version: 1.0

130: Coordinator Service Specification 
Latest Specification Version: 1.0

131: TR069 Connector Service Specification 
Latest Specification Version: 1.0

132: Repository Service Specification 
Latest Specification Version: 1.1

133: Service Loader Mediator Specification 
Latest Specification Version: 1.0

134: Subsystem Service Specification 
Latest Specification Version: 1.1

137: REST Management Service Specification 
Latest Specification Version: 1.0

138: Asynchronous Service Specification 
Latest Specification Version: 1.0

139: EnOcean Device Service Specification 
Latest Specification Version: 1.0

140: Http Whiteboard Specification 
Latest Specification Version: 1.1

141: Device Abstraction Layer Specification 
Latest Specification Version: 1.0

142: Device Abstraction Layer Functions Specification 
Latest Specification Version: 1.0

143: Network Interface Information Service Specification 
Latest Specification Version: 1.0

144: Resource Monitoring Specification 
Latest Specification Version: 1.0

145: USB Information Device Category Specification 
Latest Specification Version: 1.0

146: Serial Devices Service Specification 
Latest Specification Version: 1.0

147: Transaction Control Service Specification 
Latest Specification Version: 1.0

148: Cluster Information Specification 
Latest Specification Version: 1.0

149: Device Service Specification for ZigBee™ 
Latest Specification Version: 1.0

150: Configurator Specification 
Latest Specification Version: 1.0

151: JAX-RS Whiteboard Specification 
Latest Specification Version: 1.0

152: CDI Integration Specification 
Latest Specification Version: 1.0

153: Service Layer API for oneM2M™ 
Latest Specification Version: 1.0

154: Residential Device Management Tree Specification 
Latest Specification Version: 1.0

155: TR-157 Amendment 3 Software Module Guidelines 
Latest Specification Version: 1.0

157: Typed Event Service Specification 
Latest Specification Version: 1.0

158: Log Stream Provider Service Specification 
Latest Specification Version: 1.0

159: Feature Service Specification 
Latest Specification Version: 1.0

702: XML Parser Service Specification 
Latest Specification Version: 1.0

703: Position Specification 
Latest Specification Version: 1.0

704: Measurement and State Specification 
Latest Specification Version: 1.0

705: Promises Specification 
Latest Specification Version: 1.1

706: Push Stream Specification 
Latest Specification Version: 1.0

707: Converter Specification 
Latest Specification Version: 1.0

See also 
 OSGi

References

External links 
 http://www.osgi.org/Specifications/HomePage

Java (programming language)